In mathematics, a ring class field is the abelian extension of an algebraic number field K associated by class field theory to the ring class group of some order O of the ring of integers of K.

Properties
Let K be an algebraic number field.
 The ring class field for the maximal order O = OK is the Hilbert class field H.

Let L be the ring class field for the order Z[] in the number field K = Q().
 If p is an odd prime not dividing n, then p splits completely in L if and only if p splits completely in K.
 L = K(a) for a an algebraic integer with minimal polynomial over Q of degree h(−4n), the class number of an order with discriminant −4n.
 If O is an order and a is a proper fractional O-ideal (i.e. {x ϵ K&hairsp;* : xa ⊂ a} = O), write j(a) for the j-invariant of the associated elliptic curve. Then  K(j(a)) is the ring class field of O and j(a) is an algebraic integer.

References

External links
Ring class fields. 

Algebraic number theory